The Eleventh Wisconsin Legislature convened from January 13, 1858, to March 17, 1858, in regular session.

Senators representing even-numbered districts were newly elected for this session and were serving the first year of a two-year term.  Assembly members were elected to a one-year term.  Assembly members and even-numbered senators were elected in the general election of November 3, 1857.  Senators representing odd-numbered districts were serving the second year of their two-year term, having been elected in the general election held on November 4, 1856.

Major events
 January 4, 1858: Inauguration of Alexander Randall as the 6th Governor of Wisconsin.

Major legislation
 February 25, 1858: Act to divide the County of Dunn, and create the County of Pepin, 1858 Act 15
 March 5, 1858: Act to divide the County of Marquette and erect the County of Green Lake, 1858 Act 17
 May 12, 1858: Act providing for the organization, enrolling and discipline of the Militia of the State of Wisconsin, 1858 Act 87
 May 17, 1858: Act to protect the people against corrupt and secret influences of matters of Legislation, 1858 Act 145

Party summary

Senate summary

Assembly summary

Sessions
 1st Regular session: January 13, 1858 – March 17, 1858

Leaders

Senate leadership
 President of the Senate: Erasmus D. Campbell, Lieutenant Governor
 President pro tempore: Hiram H. Giles

Assembly leadership
 Speaker of the Assembly: Frederick S. Lovell

Members

Members of the Senate
Members of the Wisconsin Senate for the Eleventh Wisconsin Legislature (30):

Members of the Assembly
Members of the Assembly for the Eleventh Wisconsin Legislature:

Employees

Senate employees
 Chief Clerk: John L. V. Thomas
 Sergeant-at-Arms: Nathaniel L. Stout

Assembly employees
 Chief Clerk: L. H. D. Crane
 Sergeant-at-Arms: Francis Massing

References

External links

1858 in Wisconsin
Wisconsin
Wisconsin legislative sessions